Belladère is a commune in the Lascahobas Arrondissement, inside the Centre department of Haiti. Its border crossing to the Dominican town Comendador is one of the four chief land crossings to the Dominican Republic.

It belonged to the Dominican Republic until 1936, when Dominican and Haitian leaders agreed to a boundary change in favor of Haiti, as the Haitian government commanded by Sténio Vincent wanted to move the border eastward while the Dominican regime under Rafael Trujillo saw the relinquish of the territory (despite some domestic opposition) as a de-Haitianization of the country, as that area had experienced a significant Haitian settlement in the previous decades, bolster by both Haiti's population explosion and scarcity of wastelands, with ethnic Dominicans becoming a minority in Belladère (then Veladero) and its surrounding areas.

References

Populated places in Centre (department)
Dominican Republic–Haiti border crossings
Communes of Haiti